Lyctus cavicollis, known generally as the shiny powderpost beetle or western lyctus beetle, is a species of powder-post beetle in the family Bostrichidae. It is found in Australia, Europe and Northern Asia (excluding China), and North America.

References

Further reading

External links

 

Bostrichidae
Articles created by Qbugbot
Beetles described in 1866